For the Moment is a live album by pianist Barry Harris which was recorded in New York in 1984 and released on the Uptown label the following year.

Reception 

In his review on Allmusic, Scott Yanow called it "A delightful and enthusiastic set" and stated "Throughout his career, pianist Barry Harris has kept the spirit of bebop and the music of Bud Powell and Thelonious Monk alive in his joyous and creative playing".

Track listing 
All compositions by Barry Harris except where noted.

 "I Love Lucy" (Eliot Daniel, Harold Adamson) – 5:56
 "My Heart Stood Still" (Richard Rodgers, Lorenz Hart) – 5:59
 "Bean and the Boys" (Coleman Hawkins) – 4:43 Additional track on CD reissue
 "To Monk with Love" – 5:50
 "For the Moment" – 2:55
 "Chico the Man" – 7:09
 "Monk Medley: Reflections/Light Blue/Well, You Needn't/Rhythm-a-Ning" (Thelonious Monk) – 8:31
 "Shaw Nuff" (Charlie Parker) – 7:35 Additional track on CD reissue
 "7-9-3-4-0" – 5:02 Additional track on CD reissue
 "Save Some for Later" – 6:15
 "Looking Glass" – 6:21
 "To Monk With Love" – 5:03 Additional track on CD reissue
 "One More Blues" – 6:09 Additional track on CD reissue

Personnel 
Barry Harris – piano
Rufus Reid – bass
Leroy Williams - drums

References 

Barry Harris live albums
1985 live albums
Uptown Records (jazz) live albums